The Men's 200 metre breaststroke competition of the 2018 FINA World Swimming Championships (25 m) was held on 13 December 2018.

Records
Prior to the competition, the existing world and championship records were as follows.

The following new records were set during this competition:

Results

Heats
The heats were started at 11:05.

Final
The final was held at 19:00.

References

Men's 200 metre breaststroke